Blanka Bíró (born 22 September 1994) is a Hungarian handball goalkeeper for Ferencvárosi TC and the Hungarian national team.

Achievements
Nemzeti Bajnokság I:
Winner: 2021
Magyar Kupa:
Winner: 2017

Awards and recognition
 Hungarian Handballer of the Year: 2020
 Handball-Planet.com World Young Female All-Star Team: 2015–16
 Best Young Player of the EHF Champions League: 2017

References

External links

1994 births
Living people
People from Vác
Hungarian female handball players
Ferencvárosi TC players (women's handball)
Handball players at the 2020 Summer Olympics
Sportspeople from Pest County